The 1979 Portland Timbers season was the fifth season for the Portland Timbers in the now-defunct North American Soccer League.

Squad

Roster players  
The 1979 squad

Replacement players  
This list shows players used during the brief player strike on April 14, 1979.

North American Soccer League

National Conference, Western Division standings 

Pld = Matches played; W = Matches won; L = Matches lost; GF = Goals for; GA = Goals against; GD = Goal difference; Pts = PointsSource:

League results 

* = Shootout winSource:

References

1979
American soccer clubs 1979 season
1979 in sports in Oregon
Portland
1979 in Portland, Oregon